The monument to Victor Ponedelnik (or sculpture "The Footballer") - a bronze sculptural composition, was installed near the stadium "Olympus-2" in Rostov-on-Don in honor to the footballer Victor Ponedelnik, who scored the "golden goal" in the final of 1960 European Nations' Cup.

History 
In Rostov-on-Don, on the initiative of the Ministry of Sports of the region, a contest was organized to create the sculpture of the famous footballer Viktor Ponedelnik. In August of the same year, the sculptor Dmitry Lyndin was offered to take part in the contest. In September, the sculptor presented a sample of his work, made of clay. 3 other participants competed with him. A jury, which was joined by the vice-governor of the region Sergei Gorban, footballer Victor Ponedelnik and the sports minister of the Rostov region Yuri Balanchin was convened. According to the results of the contest, Dmitry Lyndin was chosen the winner. The only correction that the sculptor had to do in his work was the height of the football leg warmers - it should have been increased.

The creation of bronze sculpture took 2 months, from September to November 2013. The cost of materials was estimated at 750 thousand rubles, the sculptor and casters worked for free. The sculpture is 2 meters high. Initially the spring of 2014 was announced the date of installation of the monument. But due to financial nuances - reimbursement of expenses for materials - the date was postponed for an indefinite period. In July 2014, it became known that the amount of 96.5 thousand rubles was collected and allotted to the monument by veterans of football and the Don federation of football.

The Don sports minister declared that the installation and the opening of the monument was decided to coincide with the day when the first match of FC Rostov in the UEFA Europa League will take place. It was decided to install the monument near the stadium "Olympus-2". The opening of the monument to footballer Victor Ponedelnik, which is also often called the sculpture "The footballer", was held on August 28, 2015. The Deputy Governor of the Rostov Region Igor Guskov visited the solemn ceremony.

References 

Tourist attractions in Rostov-on-Don
Monuments and memorials in Rostov-on-Don